"Khapta" is a song by French-Algerian rapper Heuss l'Enfoiré featuring vocals from French rapper Sofiane. It was released on 8 March 2019 and topped the French SNEP chart.

Charts

Certifications

References

2019 singles
2019 songs
French-language songs